Joseph Frank Bianco (born September 11, 1966) is an American lawyer and jurist serving as a United States circuit judge of the United States Court of Appeals for the Second Circuit. He was formerly a United States district judge of the United States District Court for the Eastern District of New York.

Early life and education 

Bianco was born in Flushing, New York. He received a Bachelor of Arts degree from Georgetown University in 1988, and a Juris Doctor from Columbia Law School in 1991. He earned a Master of Arts from the Seminary of the Immaculate Conception in 2013, and is an ordained Roman Catholic deacon.

Career 
Bianco was a law clerk to Judge Peter K. Leisure of the United States District Court for the Southern District of New York from 1992 to 1993. He then became an associate at Simpson, Thacher & Bartlett, where he worked for one year.

From 1994 to 2003, Bianco served as an assistant United States attorney for the Southern District of New York. In 2003 and 2004, he was counsel at Debevoise & Plimpton. Before becoming a judge, Bianco was senior counsel and a deputy assistant attorney general in the United States Department of Justice Criminal Division.

Bianco taught as an adjunct professor at Fordham University School of Law from 2002 to 2004. From 2009 to 2013, he was an adjunct at the Maurice A. Deane School of Law. He was an adjunct professor of law at Touro Law Center from 2007 to 2014. He has taught as an adjunct at the St. John's University School of Law since 2006. He has been a member of the Federalist Society since 2004.

District court 
Bianco is a former United States district judge of the United States District Court for the Eastern District of New York. Bianco was nominated by President George W. Bush on July 28, 2005, to a seat vacated by Denis Reagan Hurley. He was confirmed unanimously by the United States Senate on December 21, 2005 and received his commission on January 3, 2006. As a district court judge, Bianco oversaw a number of murder cases against MS-13 gang members. His service on the district court terminated upon his elevation to the 2nd Circuit Court on May 17, 2019.

Court of appeals 
On October 10, 2018, President Donald Trump announced his intent to nominate Bianco to the United States Court of Appeals for the Second Circuit. On November 13, 2018, his nomination was sent to the Senate. President Trump nominated Bianco to the seat vacated by Judge Reena Raggi, who assumed senior status on August 31, 2018. Also on November 13, 2018, the American Bar Association unanimously rated Bianco as "Well Qualified," its highest rating.

On January 3, 2019, his nomination was returned to the President under Rule XXXI, Paragraph 6 of the United States Senate. On January 23, 2019, President Trump announced his intent to renominate Bianco to a federal judgeship. His nomination was sent to the Senate later that day. On February 13, 2019, a hearing on his nomination was held before the Senate Judiciary Committee. On March 7, 2019, his nomination was reported out of committee by a 12–10 vote. On May 6, 2019, the U.S. Senate invoked cloture on his nomination by a 51–40 vote. On May 8, 2019, his nomination was confirmed by a 54–42 vote. He received his judicial commission on May 13, 2019.

Personal life 

Bianco is married and has six children.

References

External links 
 
 

|-

1966 births
Living people
20th-century American lawyers
21st-century American lawyers
21st-century American judges
American people of Italian descent
Assistant United States Attorneys
Georgetown University alumni
Columbia Law School alumni
Federalist Society members
Fordham University faculty
Hofstra University faculty
Judges of the United States District Court for the Eastern District of New York
Judges of the United States Court of Appeals for the Second Circuit
People from Flushing, Queens
Catholics from New York (state)
American Roman Catholic deacons
St. John's University (New York City) faculty
Touro College faculty
United States Department of Justice lawyers
United States district court judges appointed by George W. Bush
United States court of appeals judges appointed by Donald Trump